Gianni Vignaduzzi (born 27 August 1966) is a retired track cyclist from Canada who represented his country at the 1988 Summer Olympics in Seoul, South Korea, where he finished in 17th place in the Men's Points Race and at the 1992 Summer Olympics in Barcelona, where he finished in 26th position in the Men's Individual Road Race.

References

1966 births
Living people
Canadian male cyclists
Cyclists at the 1988 Summer Olympics
Cyclists at the 1992 Summer Olympics
Olympic cyclists of Canada
Cyclists from Montreal